Agnese is a given name and a variant of Agnes. Its name day is 21 January in Italy.

People with the name Agnese include:

Agnese Allegrini (born 1982), Italian badminton player
Agnese Bonfantini (born 1999), Italian football player
Agnese Koklača (born 1990), Latvian luger
Agnese del Maino (c. 1401–1465), Milanese noblewoman and the mistress of Filippo Maria Visconti
Agnese di Montefeltro (1470–1523), daughter of Federico da Montefeltro, duke of Urbino
Agnese Maffeis (born 1965), Italian discus thrower and shot putter
Agnese Nano (born 1965), Italian film, TV and theater actress
Agnese Ozoliņa (born 1979), Latvian swimmer
Agnese Pastare (born 1988), Latvian race walker
Agnese Possamai (born 1953), Italian middle distance runner
Agnese Rakovska, Latvian singer, member of the band Triana Park
Agnese Visconti (1363–1391), daughter of Bernabò Visconti

Fictional characters
 Agnese Mondella, one of the main characters in Alessandro Manzoni's novel The Betrothed

See also
Agnese (opera), an opera by Paer
Battista Agnese (c. 1500–1564), Genovese cartographer

References

Italian feminine given names
Latvian feminine given names